Archambault is a surname. Notable people with the name include:

 Alexandre Archambault (1829–1879), lawyer and political figure in Canada East 
 Charles Archambault ( 1812–1838), surveyor and political figure in Lower Canada
 François-Xavier Archambault (1841–1893), lawyer and political figure in Quebec
 George F. Archambault (1909–2001), pharmacy liaison officer for the United States Public Health Service 
 Gilles Archambault (born 1933), Canadian novelist
 Gilles Archambault (Canadian football) (born 1934), Canadian football player
 Jacques Archambault (c. 1604–1688), French colonist in Montreal
 Jacques Archambault (politician) (1765–1851), farmer and political figure in Lower Canada
 Jean Archambault (1780–c. 1831), farmer and political figure in Lower Canada
 Jean-Jacques Archambault (died 2001), Canadian engineer
 JoAllyn Archambault (born 1942), American cultural anthropologist
 John Archambault, American children's book author
 Joseph Archambault (1879–1964), Canadian politician and lawyer
 Joseph-Éloi Archambault (1861–1916), Canadian politician
 Larry Archambault (born 1919), Canadian ice hockey player
 Lee Archambault (born 1960), American astronaut
 Louis Archambault (1915–2003), Quebec sculptor
 Louise Archambault, Canadian film director and screenwriter
 Louise Archambault Greaves, film co-producer and director with husband William Greaves
 Maurice Archambault (1914–2002), Canadian lawyer and judge
 Michel Archambault (born 1950), Canadian ice hockey left wing
 Nico Archambault (born 1984), Canadian dancer and choreographer
 Pierre Archambault, judge on the Tax Court of Canada
 Pierre-Urgel Archambault (1812–1871), Quebec businessman and political figure
 Stephen Archambault, American politician from Rhode Island
 Sylvain Archambault, Canadian director
 Théophile Archambault (1806–1863), French psychiatrist 
 Timothy Archambault (born 1971), American Native American flautist, architect, and composer
 Yves Archambault (born 1952), Canadian ice hockey goaltender

See also
 Archambeault, surname
 Archambault (disambiguation)